The Jordan Meningitis Foundation is a non-governmental Nonprofit organization which was established in 1995 in Amman - Jordan.

Foundation
The Jordan Meningitis Foundation is the brainchild of the painter Sana Al Masri, who lost her 17-year-old daughter “Sarab” to Meningitis. Her efforts, since then, along with volunteers, members, doctors, professionals and others, have been devoted to work towards the eradication of this disease.

Goals and objectives

Disease control

Awareness:
by holding lectures and distributing free pamphlets about Meningitis in Jordan.

Vaccine:
Vaccination is the only public health tool available to prevent the vast majority of HIB disease. There is no vaccine yet available against all strains of Meningitis. Research continues in many countries abroad to develop vaccines against the most common strains and to find better ways of controlling the disease. Over 40 countries have included HIB vaccines in their expanded programs of immunization.
In October 1998, the JMF received a grant, generously provided by the Embassy of Japan in Jordan, to purchase Hib vaccine. Through this grass-root grant, a first step was taken to establish a pilot project in East Amman with plans for expansion into a second rural area. The pilot project would protect approximately 10,000 children from the HIB disease.

Research:
Jordanian Meningitis Foundation supports research and studies which help in controlling the disease.

Caring for victims of meningitis
 Financial aid for the  low income households to take care of disabled Meningitis victims.
 Increase access to aid tools  and medication for disabled Meningitis victims.
 Ensure specialized services to disabled Meningitis victims, both through institutions and through the community based on training.
 Opportunities in education and training for lucky survivors of  Meningitis.

Rehabilitation
The JMF rehabilitation center has helped disabled children from meningitis to be promising cases after being regarded hopeless cases under the supervision of specialized physiotherapist, and with the aid of specialized equipment (donation from the Japanese Embassy), thus improving mobility for children.
The rehabilitation program is pursuant to 4 days a week which runs by a pediatrician, a physical therapist, a special needs assistant and a social worker.

JMF also runs monthly field trips to family homes, where by a physiotherapist, and the social worker, respectively, attend to physical therapy, and attend to health, sanitation, and general social and financial well being of the children and their surroundings.

References

External links
 Official website

1995 establishments in Jordan
Organizations established in 1995
Charities based in Amman
Medical and health organisations based in Jordan
Meningitis
Neurology organizations